Ahlat District is a district of Bitlis Province of Turkey. Its seat is the town of Ahlat. Its area is 1,153 km2, and its population is 42,131 (2021). From 1929 to 1936, it was a district of Van Province.

Composition
There are two municipalities in Ahlat District:
 Ahlat
 Ovakışla

There are 26 villages in Ahlat District:

 Akçaören
 Alakır
 Bahçe
 Burcukaya
 Çatalağzı
 Cemalettinköy
 Çukurtarla
 Develik
 Dilburnu
 Gölgören
 Güzelsu
 Kınalıkoç
 Kırıkkaya
 Kırkdönüm
 Kuşhane
 Nazik
 Otluyazı
 Sakaköy
 Serinbayır
 Seyrantepe
 Soğanlı
 Taşharman
 Uludere
 Yeniköprü
 Yoğurtyemez
 Yuvadamı

References

Districts of Bitlis Province